The 2000 NASCAR Busch Series began on February 19 and ended on November 11. Jeff Green of ppc Racing was crowned series champion.

Teams and drivers

Full schedule

Partial schedule 

Notes: 
 If under "team", the owner's name is listed and in italics, that means the name of the race team that fielded the car is unknown.
 At Races 17 and 19 (Watkins Glen and Nazareth) they were combination races with Nascar Busch North Series: John Preston, Jamie Aube, Mike Olsen, Dennis Demers, Bryan Wall and Dale Quarterley were competing for Nascar Busch North Series championship and for that reason they did not scored points for Busch Series in that races.

Races

NAPA Auto Parts 300 

The NAPA Auto Parts 300 was held February 19 at Daytona International Speedway. Hut Stricklin won the pole. Two flips occurred during this race. The first flip was on lap 15 during a 7 car pileup coming out of the tri-oval. Jeff Green got turned around and flipped once. He was uninjured, though. Later, on lap 104, coming out of the tri-oval Michael Waltrip got turned around and flipped several times. He, too, was okay.

Top ten results

Failed to qualify: Shane Hall (#0), David Starr (#16), Lyndon Amick (#35), Kevin Grubb (#37) Michael Ritch (#55), Ed Berrier (#65), C. W. Smith (#67), Blaise Alexander (#81), Greg Sacks (#84), Jimmie Johnson (#92), Gus Wasson (#96)

Alltel 200 

The Alltel 200 was held February 26 at North Carolina Speedway. Mark Martin won the pole.

Top ten results

Failed to qualify: Mike Skinner (#19), Ward Burton (#22), Hut Stricklin (#61), Kevin Harvick (#2), Dick Trickle (#5), Shane Hall (#0), Jason Jarrett (#11), Mike Stefanik (#90), Wayne Grubb (#83), Ricky Hendrick (#24), Ken Alexander (#03), Johnny Benson (#91)

 Dick Trickle failed to qualify his #5 car so he bought Michael Waltrip's place in the field (#7 car) and renumbered it to his #5 car.

Sam's Town 300 

The Sam's Town 300 was held March 4 at Las Vegas Motor Speedway. Hank Parker Jr. won the pole.

Top ten results

Failed to qualify: Anthony Lazzaro (#97), Jay Sauter (#43), Rich Bickle (#91), Boris Said (#12), Gus Wasson (#96), Steve Park (#31), Tony Roper (#50), Hermie Sadler (#30), Shane Hall (#0), Mike Skinner (#19), Dave Steele (#82)

Aaron's 312 

The Aaron's 312 was held March 11 at Atlanta Motor Speedway. Matt Kenseth won the pole.

Top ten results

Failed to qualify: Hermie Sadler (#30), Rich Bickle (#91), Tony Roper (#50), Gus Wasson (#96), Michael Ritch (#55), Jason Leffler (#18), Terry Labonte/Glenn Allen Jr. (#44), Dave Steele (#82), Gary Bradberry (#86), Ron Young (#70)

SunCom 200 

The SunCom 200 was held March 18 at Darlington Raceway. Mark Martin won the pole.

Top ten results

Failed to qualify: Jason Jarrett (#11), Dave Steele (#82), Terry Labonte (#44), Wayne Grubb (#83), Ricky Hendrick (#24), Shane Hall (#0), Bobby Hillin Jr. (#8), Jeff Purvis (#4), Morgan Shepherd (#19), Tony Roper (#50)

Cheez-It 250 

The Cheez-It 250 was held March 25 at Bristol Motor Speedway. Jeff Green won the pole.

Top ten results

Failed to qualify: Hermie Sadler (#30), Bobby Hillin Jr. (#8), Tony Roper (#50), Mike Borkowski (#20), Brad Teague (#49), Michael Ritch (#55), Shane Hall (#0), Tracy Hines (#12), Jason Jarrett (#11), Mark Day (#16)

• Marlin would capture his 2nd and final win, as well as his first since the 1990 All Pro 300.

Albertsons 300 

The Albertsons 300 was held April 1 at Texas Motor Speedway. Jason Leffler won the pole.

Top ten results

Failed to qualify: Chad Little (#30), Terry Labonte (#44), Bobby Hillin Jr. (#8), Anthony Lazzaro (#97), Michael Waltrip (#7), Tony Roper (#50), Jeff Fuller (#82), Michael Ritch (#55), Jason Jarrett (#11), Rich Bickle (#91), Dave Blaney (#20)

The race was known for a controversial move by MTV Networks to not broadcast the race after a rain delay.

BellSouth Mobility 320 

The final BellSouth Mobility 320 was held April 8 at Nashville Speedway USA. Casey Atwood won the pole.

Top ten results

Failed to qualify: Andy Kirby (#39), Joe Buford (#16), Brad Baker (#13), David Keith (#95), Ron Young (#71), Kelly Denton (#75), Ashton Lewis (#46), Tyler Walker (#28), P. J. Jones (#19), Sammy Ragan (#78), Philip Morris (#30)

Touchstone Energy 300 

The Touchstone Energy 300 was held April 14 at Talladega Superspeedway. Todd Bodine won the pole.

Top ten results

Failed to qualify: Johnny Rumley (#0), Bobby Hillin Jr. (#8), Chad Little (#30), Kelly Denton (#75), Anthony Lazzaro (#97)

Auto Club 300 

The Auto Club 300 was held April 29 at California Speedway. Jeff Green won the pole.

Top ten results

Failed to qualify: none

Hardee's 250 

The Hardee's 250 was held May 5 at Richmond International Raceway. Jeff Green won the pole.

Top ten results

Failed to qualify: Mike Stefanik (#90), Curtis Markham (#29), Lance Hooper (#0), Kenny Wallace (#25), P. J. Jones (#19), Kenny Irwin Jr. (#42), Jason Jarrett (#11), Tony Roper (#50), Chad Little (#30), Ken Alexander (#03)

Final Busch Series start for Adam Petty.

Busch 200 

The Busch 200 was held May 13 at New Hampshire International Speedway. Tim Fedewa won the pole. The weekend was marked by tragedy, when during a practice run on May 12, 19-year-old Adam Petty lost control of his race car and crashed into the Turn 3 wall. He did not survive the accident.

Top ten results

Failed to qualify: Ricky Hendrick (#24), Tony Roper (#50), Wayne Grubb (#83), Ashton Lewis (#46), Andy Kirby (#39)

Withdrew: Adam Petty (#45)

Carquest Auto Parts 300 

The Carquest Auto Parts 300 was held May 27 at Lowe's Motor Speedway. Dave Blaney won the pole.

Top ten results

Failed to qualify: P. J. Jones (#19), Michael Waltrip (#7), Anthony Lazzaro (#97), Jeff Purvis (#4), Mark Green (#63), Wayne Grubb (#83), Jim Bown (#51), Ashton Lewis (#46), Stanton Barrett (#50), Roberto Guerrero (#72), Michael Ritch (#55), Bobby Hillin Jr. (#8), Rich Bickle (#91), Justin Labonte (#44)

MBNA Platinum 200 

The MBNA Platinum 200 was held June 3 at Dover International Speedway. Kevin Harvick won the pole.

Top ten results

Failed to qualify: Mike Stefanik (#90), Bobby Hillin Jr. (#8), Jason Jarrett (#11), Chad Little (#30), Rich Bickle (#91)

Textilease/Medique 300 

The final Textilease/Medique 300 was held June 10 at South Boston Speedway. Casey Atwood won the pole.

Top ten results

Failed to qualify: R. D. Smith (#79), Forrest Urban Jr. (#54)

Myrtle Beach 250 

The final Myrtle Beach 250 was held June 17 at Myrtle Beach Speedway. Jeff Green won the pole. It was also Jay Robinson Racing's first start

Top ten results

Failed to qualify: Richard Jarvis Jr. (#54), Jason Jarrett (#11), Andy Kirby (#39), Lance Hooper (#0)

Lysol 200 

The Lysol 200 was held June 25 at Watkins Glen International. Ron Fellows won the pole. This race was known for a massive crash involving then-Busch Series regular Jimmie Johnson. Johnson's brakes failed entering turn 1, causing his car to smack the styrofoam retaining wall at about 140 miles per hour. Johnson was uninjured, even standing on top of the car and pumping his fists in the air after the wreck.

Top ten results

Failed to qualify: Michael Ritch (#55), Dale Quarterley (#32), Jaime Guerrero (#72), John Preston (#12)

Sears DieHard 250 

The Sears DieHard 250 was held July 2 at The Milwaukee Mile. Jeff Green won the pole.

Top ten results

Failed to qualify: Ricky Hendrick (#24), Ted Smokstad (#12), Ashton Lewis (#46), Mario Gosselin (#58), Brad Baker (#13), David Starr (#16), Mel Walen (#88), Doug Reid III (#86)

 Scott Hansen qualified the #45 for Kyle Petty.

Econo Lodge 200 

The Econo Lodge 200 was held July 16 at Nazareth Speedway. Jeff Green won the pole.

Top ten results

Failed to qualify: Jason Jarrett (#11), Bill Hoff (#93), Derrick Gilchrest (#15)

NAPA Autocare 250 

The NAPA Autocare 250 was held July 22 at Pikes Peak International Raceway. Jeff Purvis won the pole.

Top ten results

Failed to qualify: Brendan Gaughan (#16)

Carquest Auto Parts 250 

The Carquest Auto Parts 250 was held July 29 at Gateway International Raceway. Jeff Green won the pole. Qualifying for this event was rained out.

Top ten results

Failed to qualify: Bobby Hillin Jr. (#8), Andy Kirby (#39), Hut Stricklin (#11), Johnny Rumley (#0), Mel Walen (#85), Doug Reid III (#86), Curtis Markham (#29), Jay Fogleman (#68)

This was Kevin Harvick's first career victory in the NASCAR Busch Series.

Kroger 200 

The Kroger 200 was held August 4 at Indianapolis Raceway Park at Indianapolis Raceway Park. Jason Leffler won the pole.

Top ten results

Failed to qualify: Brad Baker (#13), Justin Labonte (#44), Sammy Sanders (#16), Jay Fogleman (#68), Brian Tyler (#49), Mel Walen (#85), Forrest Urban Jr. (#54), Bill Hoff (#93)

NAPAonline.com 250 

The NAPAonline.com 250 was held August 19 at Michigan International Speedway. Buckshot Jones won the pole.

Top ten results

Failed to qualify: Morgan Shepherd (#11), Michael Ritch (#55), P. J. Jones (#19), Rich Bickle (#91), Brett Bodine (#44), Doug Reid III (#86), Mark Martin (#60)

Food City 250 

The Food City 250 was held August 25 at Bristol Motor Speedway. Kevin Harvick won the pole.

Top ten results

Failed to qualify: Jay Fogleman (#68), Wayne Grubb (#83), Matt Kenseth (#17), P. J. Jones (#19), Ashton Lewis (#46), Ron Young (#70), Tom Hubert (#20), Ricky Hendrick (#24), Doug Reid III (#86), Justin Labonte (#44)

Dura Lube/All Pro Bumper to Bumper 200 

The Dura Lube/All Pro Bumper to Bumper 200 was held September 2 at Darlington Raceway. Mark Martin won the pole.

Top ten results

Failed to qualify: Steve Park (#31), Justin Labonte, Andy Kirby (#39), Mike Stefanik (#90), Jason Jarrett (#11), Stanton Barrett (#12)

Autolite/Fram 250 

The Autolite/Fram 250 was held September 8 at Richmond International Raceway. Todd Bodine won the pole.

Top ten results

Failed to qualify: Michael Ritch (#55), Rich Bickle (#91), Tim Sauter (#61), Steve Park (#31), Ashton Lewis (#46), Mike Stefanik (#90), Justin Labonte (#44), Wayne Grubb (#83), Jay Fogleman (#68), Hermie Sadler (#6), Forrest Urban Jr. (#54), Richard Jarvis Jr. (#80), Bill Hoff (#93)

MBNA.com 200 

The MBNA.com 200 was held September 23 at Dover International Speedway. Mike Skinner won the pole.

Top ten results

Failed to qualify: Terry Labonte (#44), P. J. Jones (#19), Andy Kirby (#39)

All Pro Bumper to Bumper 300 

The All Pro Bumper to Bumper 300 was held October 7 at Lowe's Motor Speedway. Matt Kenseth won the pole.

Top ten results

Failed to qualify: Justin Labonte (#44), Steve Park (#31), Sterling Marlin (#01), Rich Bickle (#91), Mike Stefanik (#90), Johnny Rumley (#0), Chad Little (#74), Michael Ritch (#55), Terry Labonte (#04), Ricky Craven (#19), Ashton Lewis (#74), Jay Fogleman (#68)

Sam's Club 200 

The Sam's Club 200 was held October 21 at North Carolina Speedway. Mark Martin won the pole.

Top ten results

Failed to qualify: Jason Jarrett (#11), Andy Kirby (#39), Michael Waltrip (#99), Lyndon Amick (#35), Brandon Butler (#83), Mike Stefanik (#90), Tim Sauter (#61), Scott Wimmer (#20), Rich Bickle (#91), Jay Fogleman (#68)
With his victory Jeff Green clinches the championship with 3 races remaining.

Sam's Town 250 

The Sam's Town 250 was held October 29 at Memphis Motorsports Park. Jeff Green won the pole.

Top ten results

Failed to qualify: Ashton Lewis (#46), Mike Stefanik (#90), Justin Labonte (#44), Jason Jarrett (#11), Ron Young (#70), Sammy Sanders (#16), Steadman Marlin (#01), Wayman Wittman (#93)

Outback Steakhouse 200 

The Outback Steakhouse 200 was held November 4 at Phoenix International Raceway. Jason Leffler won the pole.

Top ten results

Failed to qualify:  Curtis Markham (#29), Hut Stricklin (#11), Justin Labonte (#44), Ashton Lewis (#46), Rich Bickle (#91), Brandon Butler (#83), Rick Carelli (#86)

Miami 300 

The Miami 300 was held November 11 at Homestead-Miami Speedway. Bobby Hamilton Jr. won the pole.

Top ten results

Failed to qualify: Mike Dillon (#21), Sterling Marlin (#01), Chad Little (#74), Justin Labonte (#44), Michael Ritch (#55), Rich Bickle (#91), Lyndon Amick (#35), Curtis Markham (#29), Ricky Craven (#19), Mark McFarland (#84), Ashton Lewis (#46), Mark Green (#63)

Final Busch Series start and win for Jeff Gordon as well as JG Motorsports.

Full Drivers' Championship

(key) Bold – Pole position awarded by time. Italics – Pole position set by owner's points. * – Most laps led.

Rookie of the Year 
Kevin Harvick tied for a record three wins and beat out pre-season favorite Ron Hornaday Jr. for the Rookie of the Year award in 2000, despite missing one race. Hornaday, the only rookie candidate to compete in every race, had two wins and a fifth-place points finish. Jimmie Johnson drove for a brand-new team and had a tenth-place points finish, while Jay Sauter had eight top-ten finishes. Michael Ritch struggled with qualifying problems all year, while P. J. Jones, Anthony Lazzaro, Mike Borkowski, and Dave Steele were all open-wheel drivers who were released from their rides early in the season. Mike Stefanik was the only other rookie candidate.

See also 
 2000 NASCAR Winston Cup Series
 2000 NASCAR Craftsman Truck Series

References

External links 
Archived NASCAR online results
Busch Series standings and statistics for 2000

NASCAR Xfinity Series seasons